Salamanca Place is a precinct of Hobart, the capital city of the Australian state of Tasmania.

Salamanca Place itself consists of rows of sandstone buildings, formerly warehouses for the port of Hobart Town that have since been converted into restaurants, galleries, craft shops and offices. It was named after the victory in 1812 of the Duke of Wellington in the Battle of Salamanca in the Spanish province of Salamanca. It was previously called "The Cottage Green".

Each Saturday, Salamanca Place is the site for Salamanca Market, which is popular with tourists and locals. The markets are ranked as one of the most popular tourist attractions visited each year.

Salamanca Place is also popular after dark with both locals and visitors enjoying bars and eateries located there and the nearby wharves.

In the mid-1990s, Salamanca Square, a sheltered public square was built. Ringed by shops, cafes, and restaurants, the centrepiece fountain and its lawns are a safe environment where children play alongside individuals and families. There is also an adjoining undercover carpark and a large apartment complex.

There are many laneways and several squares adjacent to Salamanca Place, built during the whaling industry boom in the early and mid-19th century.

Salamanca Place is featured as a property in the Australian version of Monopoly.

Gallery

References

 Document which includes how Salamanca Place was named (PDF)
 Hobart City Council's Salamanca Market webpage

Streets in Hobart
Shopping districts and streets in Australia
Sandstone buildings in Australia
Historic districts
Geography of Hobart
Tourist attractions in Hobart
Port of Hobart